Akhtar Mohiuddin (born 1 March 1956 in Chaman, Pakistan), is a Pakistani professional football coach and former player who was most recently, the head coach of PMC Athletico. Mohiuddin was also the head coach of the Pakistan football team from 2007 to 2008.

Managerial career 

When Salman Sharida quit as Pakistan manager in 2007, Mohiuddin was given the role 2 months before the 2010 World Cup qualifiers. Pakistan had to face Asian champions Iraq. Pakistan were defeated 7-0 in the first leg but they were able to hold Iraq to a nil-nil draw in the second leg.

After the second leg draw, Mohiuddin was retained as manager for the rest of the 2008 fixtures. Pakistan played a two match away series against Nepal in late March as preparation for the 2008 AFC Challenge Cup qualifiers. Pakistan lost the first match 2-1 as even though they held the lead for most of the match, two late Nepal goals resulted in a loss for Pakistan. They bounced back however, in the second match and won 2-0.

They then travelled to Taipei for 2008 AFC Challenge Cup qualifiers where Pakistan were favourites to qualify for the main round. Pakistan first faced Chinese Taipei, and they came back from 1-0 down to 2-1 and eventually won the game. However, in the next game, Sri Lanka defeated Pakistan 7-1 with a hat trick from Kasun Jayasuriya. With the final game being dead rubber, Pakistan had a big win with a 9-2 victory over Guam, Pakistan's biggest victory in their history.

The SAFF Championship 2008 would prove to be Mohiuddin’s last tournament as manager when Pakistan failed to go beyond the group stages losing 3-0 to Maldives, 2-0 to India and 4-1 to Nepal.

He briefly returned as the Pakistan manager for the 2010 Asian Games with Graham Roberts as a coaching consultant. The team performed poorly as Pakistan lost 3 their matches and drew one which meant that Mohiuddin was replaced afterwards.

He was appointed the head coach of PMC Athletico for the 2011/12 season. PMC Athletico went on to finish 14th in the league, 3 points above the relegation zone.

References

External links
Faisal appoints Akhtar Mohiuddin as head coach

Pakistani football managers
Pakistan national football team managers
People from Killa Abdullah District
Living people
1956 births